The 1984 New York Yankees season was the 82nd season for the Yankees. The team finished in third place in the American League Eastern Division with a record of 87-75, finishing 17 games behind the Detroit Tigers. New York was managed by Yogi Berra. The Yankees played at Yankee Stadium.

Offseason 
 November 9, 1983: Rowland Office was released by the Yankees.
 November 22, 1983: Amalio Carreno was signed by the New York Yankees as an amateur free agent.
 December 8, 1983: Steve Balboni and Roger Erickson were traded by the Yankees to the Kansas City Royals for Mike Armstrong and Duane Dewey (minors).
 December 19, 1983: Mike Browning (minors) was traded by the Yankees to the California Angels for Curt Brown.
 January 17, 1984: Tim Belcher was drafted by the Yankees in the 1st round (1st pick) of the 1984 Major League Baseball Draft (Secondary Phase). Player signed February 2, 1984.
 February 5, 1984: Otis Nixon, George Frazier and a player to be named later were traded by the Yankees to the Cleveland Indians for Toby Harrah and a player to be named later. On February 8, the deal was completed, as the Indians sent Rick Browne (minors) to the Yankees, and the Yankees sent Guy Elston (minors) to the Indians.
 February 8, 1984: Tim Belcher was chosen from the Yankees by the Oakland Athletics from the Yankees as a free agent compensation pick.
 March 30, 1984: Graig Nettles was traded by the Yankees to the San Diego Padres for Dennis Rasmussen and a player to be named later. The Padres completed the deal by sending Darin Cloninger (minors) to the Yankees on April 26.

Regular season 
 Dave Winfield was the runner up to Don Mattingly for the American League batting title.

Season standings

Record vs. opponents

Notable transactions 
 April 17, 1984: Oscar Gamble was signed as a free agent by the Yankees.
 July 18, 1984: Roy Smalley was traded by the Yankees to the Chicago White Sox for players to be named later. The White Sox completed the deal by sending Doug Drabek and Kevin Hickey to the Yankees on August 13.

Roster

Game log

Regular season

|-

|-

|-

|- style="background:#bbcaff;"
| – || July 10 || ||colspan=10 |1984 Major League Baseball All-Star Game at Candlestick Park in San Francisco
|-

|-

|-

|- style="text-align:center;"
| Legend:       = Win       = Loss       = PostponementBold = Yankees team member

Player stats

Batting

Starters by position 
Note: Pos = Position; G = Games played; AB = At bats; H = Hits; Avg. = Batting average; HR = Home runs; RBI = Runs batted in

Other batters 
Note: G = Games played; AB = At bats; H = Hits; Avg. = Batting average; HR = Home runs; RBI = Runs batted in

Pitching

Starting pitchers 
Note: G = Games pitched; IP = Innings pitched; W = Wins; L = Losses; ERA = Earned run average; SO = Strikeouts

Other pitchers 
Note: G = Games pitched; IP = Innings pitched; W = Wins; L = Losses; ERA = Earned run average; SO = Strikeouts

Relief pitchers 
Note: G = Games pitched; W = Wins; L = Losses; SV = Saves; ERA = Earned run average; SO = Strikeouts

Awards and honors 
 Ron Guidry, Pitcher, Gold Glove
 Ron Guidry, Roberto Clemente Award
 Dave Winfield, Outfield, Silver Slugger Award
 Dave Winfield, Outfield, Gold Glove

All-Star Game
 Don Mattingly
 Dave Winfield
 Phil Niekro

League leaders 
 Don Mattingly – American League batting champion (.343)
 Don Mattingly – American League leader, hits (207)

Farm system 

LEAGUE CHAMPIONS: Fort Lauderdale

Notes

References 
1984 New York Yankees at Baseball Reference
1984 New York Yankees team page at www.baseball-almanac.com

New York Yankees seasons
New York Yankees
New York Yankees
1980s in the Bronx